Three submarines of the French Navy have borne the name Doris:

 , a  launched in 1927 and sunk in 1940
 , a  ordered as HMS Vineyard, Renamed on acquisition in 1944 she served until 1947.
 , a  launched in 1960 and struck in 1994

French Navy ship names